David McFarlane (born 31 August 1959) is a former Australian racing cyclist. He won the Australian national road race title in 1992.

References

External links

1959 births
Living people
Australian male cyclists
Place of birth missing (living people)